Scutiger gongshanensis is a species of toad found in Gongshan County and Biluoxueshan 碧罗雪山 of Deqen County in Yunnan, China. Part of its range is within the Gaoligongshan National Nature Reserve.

References

gongshanensis
Amphibians of China
Endemic fauna of Yunnan
Amphibians described in 1979